Stephen Peter Race SSC is a British Anglican Bishop. He is the incumbent Bishop of Beverley, having been appointed to succeed Glyn Webster on 12 October 2022.

Race was born and raised in Zimbabwe. He studied at Durham University and later qualified as a teacher. He trained for ministry at St Stephen's House, Oxford, and was ordained Priest in 2003.

References

Living people
Anglo-Catholic bishops
Anglican suffragan bishops of Beverley
Alumni of the College of St Hild and St Bede, Durham
Alumni of St Stephen's House, Oxford
English Anglo-Catholics
Year of birth missing (living people)